Cyana delicata is a moth of the family Erebidae. It was described by Francis Walker in 1854. It is found in Angola, the Democratic Republic of the Congo, Ghana, Sierra Leone and Togo.

References

Cyana
Moths described in 1854
Moths of Africa
Insects of the Democratic Republic of the Congo
Insects of West Africa
Fauna of Togo